The 1st ceremony of the Feroz Awards was held at the Cine Callao in Madrid, on January 27, 2014. It was hosted by actress Alexandra Jiménez and aired on national TV through Paramount Channel.

Winners and nominees
The winners and nominees are listed as follows:

Honorary Feroz Awad 
 José Sacristán

See also
28th Goya Awards

References

2014 film awards
Feroz Awards
2014 in Madrid
January 2014 events in Europe